The executive branch of New Jersey's state government executes state law through cabinet-level or principal departments and further by administrative agencies departments, special commissions, or independent entities as defined by statute.

Administrative agencies and offices

Department of Agriculture
The state's Department of Agriculture is overseen by a Secretary of Agriculture selected by the governor on recommendation of the State Board of Agriculture.  The department's mission is administered by five divisions.
 Division of Agriculture and Natural Resources
 State Soil Conservation Committee and Soil Conservation Districts
 Cost-Share Assistance to Farmers for Soil and Water Conservation Projects
 Office of Aquaculture Coordination 
 Agricultural Education program
 New Jersey Agricultural Statistics Service (NASS)
 Division of Animal Health
 Division of Food and Nutrition
 Division of Marketing and Development
 Division of Plant Industry

Department of Banking & Insurance

 Division of Banking
 Office of Consumer Finance
 Office of Depositories
 Division of Insurance
 Life Bureau
 Health Bureau
 Valuation Bureau
 Bureau of Fraud Deterrence
 Office of Captive Insurance
 Office for e-HIT
 Office of Property and Casualty
 Office of Solvency Regulation
 New Jersey Real Estate Commission
 Bureau of Subdivided Land Sales Control
 Office of Public Affairs

Department of Children and Families

 Division of Family and Community Partnerships
 Office of Early Childhood Services
 Office of Family Support Services
 Office of School-Linked Services
 Division on Women
 Office of Adolescent Services
 Office of Advocacy
 Office of Diversity, Equity & Belonging
 Office of Education
 Office of Licensing
 Office of Performance Management and Accountability
 Office of Strategic Development
 Child Protection and Permanency
 Children's System of Care
 Institutional Abuse Investigation Unit

Department of Community Affairs

 Division of Codes & Standards
 Bureau of Construction Project Review
 Bureau of Homeowner Protection
 Bureau of Housing Inspection
 Bureau of Rooming and Boarding House Standards
 Bureau of State and Local Code Inspections
 Office of the Director
 Office of Regulatory Affairs
 Division of Disaster Recovery & Mitigation
 Division of Fire Safety
 Bureau of Fire Code Enforcement
 Bureau of Fire Department Services
 Office of Fire Department Preparedness
 Regulatory and Legislative Office
 Office of Training & Certification
 Arson/K-9/Fire Investigation Unit
 Community Risk Reduction Unit
 Contractor Certification Unit
 NFIRS Unit
 Inspection Unit
 Registration Unit
 Local Assistance Unit
 Youth Firesetter Prevention Unit
 Division of Housing & Community Resources
 Office of Community Services
 Office of Energy Assistance
 Office of Housing Assistance
 Office of Housing Production
 Office of Neighborhood Programs
 Division of Local Government Services
 Local Assistance Bureau
 Office of Communications
 Office of Legislative Affairs
 Office of Local Planning Services
 Office of Information Privacy

Department of Corrections
The New Jersey Department of Corrections operates 13 major correctional or penal institutions, including seven adult male correctional facilities, three youth facilities, one facility for sex offenders, one women's correctional institution and a central reception and intake unit; and stabilization and reintegration programs for released inmates.

 New Jersey State Parole Board
 Division of Programs and Community Services
 Office of Community Programs and Outreach Services
 Office of County Services
 Office of Chaplaincy Services
 Volunteer Services
 Office of Victim Services
 Office of Substance Abuse Programming and Addiction Services
 Office of Educational Services
 Office of Transitional Services
 Division of Administration
 Bureau of State Use Industries 
 Office of Financial Management
 Bureau of Budget and Fiscal Planning
 Bureau of Auditing  
 Bureau of Accounting and Revenue 
 Institutional Operations Bureau
 Bureau of Procurement and Contract Management
 Office of Human Resources
 Office of Information Technology.
 Division of Operations
 AgriIndustries
 Capital Planning and Construction Unit
 Central Medical/Transportation Unit and Central Communications
 Classification support and Training/Auditing Units
 Field Services Units
 Health Services Unit
 Immigration Services, Parole Monitoring and the Office of Interstate Services
 Release Notification Unit (Central Office)
 Special Operations Group
 Special Operations Response Team (SORT)
 Canine Unit 
 Correctional Emergency Response Team (CERT)
 Departmental Firearms Unit
 Critical Incident Negotiation Team (CINT)
 Enhanced Security Transportation Unit
 Community Labor Assistance Program

Department of Education

 Division of Teaching and Learning Services
 Division of Educational Services
 Division of Field Support and Services
 Division of Early Childhood Services
 Division of Administrative Services
 Division of Legal and External Services
 Marie H. Katzenbach School for the Deaf
 Office of Assessments
 Office of Budget and Accounting
 Office of Career Readiness
 Office of Certification/Induction
 Office of Charter & Renaissance Schools
 Office of Commissions
 Office of Communications
 Office of Comprehensive Support
 Office of Controversies and Disputes
 Office of District Intervention & Support
 Office of Equal Employment Opportunity/Affirmative Action
 Office of Field Services Coordination
 Office of Fiscal Accountability and Compliance
 Office of Fiscal and Data Services
 Office of Fiscal Policy and Planning
 Office of Grants Management
 Office of Human Capital Resources
 Office of Human Capital Resources
 Office of Information Technology
 Office of Interdistrict Choice and Nonpublic Schools
 Office of K-3 Education
 Office of Legislative Affairs/Policy Development
 Office of Monitors
 Office of Performance Management
 Office of Preschool Education
 Office of  Professional Learning
 Office of Recruitment and Preparation
 Office of School Ethics and Compliance
 Office of School Facility Planning
 Office of School Facility Projects
 Office of School Finance
 Office of Special Education
 Office of Special Education Policy & Dispute Resolution
 Office of Standards
 Office of STEM
 Office of Student Support Services
 Office of Supplemental Educational Programs

Department of Environmental Protection
 Division of Parks and Forestry
 New Jersey Forest Fire Service

Department of Health

Department of Human Services

 Division of Aging Services
 Division of the Deaf & Hard of Hearing
 Division of Developmental Disabilities
 Division of Disability Services
 Division of Family Development
 Division of Medical Assistance & Health Services
 Division of Mental Health & Addiction Services
 Office of Auditing
 Office of Legal and Regulatory Affairs
 Office of New Americans
 Office for Prevention of Developmental Disabilities
 Office of Program Integrity & Accountability
 Office of Contract Policy & Management

Department of Labor & Workforce Development

Department of Law and Public Safety
The New Jersey Attorney General leads the New Jersey Department of Law and Public Safety.
 Division of Alcoholic Beverage Control
 Division on Civil Rights
 Division of Consumer Affairs
 Division of Criminal Justice
 Division of Gaming Enforcement
 Division of Highway Traffic Safety
 Division of Law
 Juvenile Justice Commission
 Racing Commission
 State Athletic Control Board
 Division of State Police
 Victims of Crime Compensation Office

Department of Military & Veterans Affairs

 New Jersey National Guard
 New Jersey Army National Guard
 New Jersey Air National Guard
 Division of Community Relations
 Division of Military/Family Support
 Division of Veterans Affairs

Department of State

Department of Transportation

Executive Offices
 Commissioner
 (Office of) Smart Growth
 (Office of) the Inspector General
 Chief of Staff
 Deputy Commissioner
 Other Offices and Divisions

 The following are under the Deputy Commissioner.
 Assistant Commissioner of Capital Investment Planning and Grant Administration
 Division of Statewide Planning
 Office of Statewide Strategies
 Office of Systems Planning
 Office of Research
 Office of Commuter Mobility
 Office of Transportation Sustainable Communities
 Division of Multimodal Services
 Division of Local Aid and Economic Development
 Division of Environmental Resources
 Division of Capital Investment Planning and Development
 Transportation Data and Safety
 Assistant Commissioner of Capital Program Management (State Transportation Engineer)
 Division of Highway and Traffic Design
 Division of Right of Way and Access Management
 Division of Capital Program Support
 Division of Project Management
 Division of Bridge Engineering and Infrastructure Management
 Division of Construction Services and Materials
 Assistant Commissioner of Operations
 Division of Operations North
 Division of Operations Central
 Division of Operations South
 (Deputy Executive) Division of Operations
 Permits, Electrical, and Claims Unit
 Assistant Commissioner of Administration
 Division of Human Resources
 Division of Support Services
 Division of Civil Rights and Affirmative Action
 Divisions under the chief financial officer
 Division of Budget
 Division of Accounting and Auditing
 Division of Procurement
 Division of Information Technology
 Assistant Commissioner of Transportation Systems Management
 Division of Traffic Operations
 Division of Mobility and Systems Engineering
 Division (at the assistant-commissioner level) of Government and Community Relations
 Community and Constituent Relations
 Communications
 Division of Legislative, Administrative, and Regulatory Actions
 Legal Services

Department of Treasury
The Department of the Treasury seeks to ensure the most beneficial use of fiscal resources and revenues to meet critical needs, all within a policy framework set by the governor; to formulate and manage the state's budget, generate and collect revenues, disburse the appropriations used to operate New Jersey state government, manage the state's physical and financial assets, and provide statewide support services to state and local government agencies.  Its mission is accomplished by the following Divisions and Agencies:
 Divisions
 Division of Administration
 Division of Investment
 Office of the Chief Economist/Office of Revenue and Economic Analysis (OREA)
 Office of Management and Budget (OMB)
 New Jersey Lottery
 Division of Pensions and Benefits
 Division of Property Management and Construction (DPMC)
 Public Contracts Equal Employment Opportunity Compliance Monitoring Program
 Division of Public Finance
 Division of Purchase and Property
 Division of Revenue and Enterprise Services (DORES)
 Division of Risk Management
 Division of Taxation
 Agencies
 Board of Public Utilities (BPU)
 Casino Control Commission (CCC)
 Division of Rate Counsel
 New Jersey Economic Development Authority
 New Jersey Building Authority (NJBA)
 New Jersey Public Broadcasting Authority
 Office of Administrative Law (OAL)
 Office of Information Technology (OIT)
 Office of the Public Defender (OPD)
 State Capitol Joint Management Commission (SCJMC)
 State House Commission
 Unclaimed Property Administration

Independent commissions and agencies

 New Jersey Advisory Committee on Police Standards
 New Jersey Commission on Brain Injury Research
 New Jersey Clean Air Council
 New Jersey Commission on Cancer Research
 New Jersey Commission on Higher Education
 New Jersey Commission on Science and Technology
 New Jersey Council on Local Mandates
 Delaware River Basin Commission
 New Jersey Division of Alcoholic Beverage Control
 New Jersey Election Law Enforcement Commission (Campaign and Lobbying Disclosure)
 New Jersey Emergency Management Agency
 New Jersey Energy Master Plan Agency
 Fort Monmouth Economic Revitalization Authority (FMERA)
 Garden State Preservation Trust
 New Jersey Governor's Council on Alcoholism and Drug Abuse
 Higher Education Student Assistance Authority
 New Jersey Highlands Council
 New Jersey Historic Trust (NJHT)
 New Jersey Homeland Security
 New Jersey Housing and Mortgage Finance Agency
 New Jersey Housing Resource Center (NJHRC)
 New Jersey Inspector General
 New Jersey Interstate Environmental Commission
 New Jersey Motor Vehicle Commission
 New Jersey Educational Facilities Authority (NJEFA)
 New Jersey Environmental Infrastructure Trust
 New Jersey Health Care Facilities Financing Authority (NJHCFFA)
 New Jersey Meadowlands Commission
 New Jersey Real Estate Commission
 New Jersey Redevelopment Authority (NJRA)
 New Jersey Schools Construction Corporation
 New Jersey Transit
 New Jersey Pinelands Commission
 New Jersey Pinelands Development Credit Bank
 New Jersey Professional Boards and Advisory Committees
 New Jersey Public Employment Relations Commission
 New Jersey Commission on Spinal Cord Research
 New Jersey State Casino Reinvestment Development Authority
 New Jersey State Commission of Investigation
 New Jersey State Employment and Training Commission
 New Jersey State Ethics Commission
 New Jersey State Library
 New Jersey State Police
 New Jersey Turnpike Authority
 New Jersey Victims of Crime Compensation Board
 New Jersey Waterfront Commission of New York Harbor

References

External links
 State of New Jersey (official website)

Government of New Jersey